El Rom (lit. To Height) is an Israeli settlement organized as a kibbutz in the northern Golan Heights in the municipal territory of the Golan Regional Council. The international community considers Israeli settlements in the Golan Heights illegal under international law, but the Israeli government disputes this.

Geography

El Rom and the nearby moshav Odem are the two Jewish settlements in Israel with the highest elevation after Nimrod.

History

The kibbutz was founded in 1971 by a core group of settlers from the Machanot HaOlim Zionist youth movement. Although they had intended to settle in Beit HaArava in the southern Jordan River Valley, they were eventually persuaded to move to the Golan Heights. The original settlement was shelled during the Yom Kippur war; most buildings were repaired, except for one or two prefabs.

Climate

El Rom has Mediterranean-type climate, with warm and dry summer followed by cold and humid winter. Summer time, in between May and September, is dry with almost no precipitation at all and temperatures of  during the day in the hot months of July and August. Nights are mostly cool due to the continental wind blowing from the vast desert to the east. The rains start in September and go on until May, filling up the reservoirs and giving a lot of water to the Sea of Galilee. The annual precipitation averages  of rain and occasional snow, but the last few years show lesser precipitation and higher temperatures. Fog is very common throughout the year.

Economy
The economy is based primarily on agriculture. Crops include apples, pears, strawberries, and grapes for wine. A cider house producing British-style alcoholic cider operates on the kibbutz. They also raise cattle and chickens. In 1984, the kibbutz established El Rom Studios to provide an alternative employment opportunities and revenue stream. The studios command a large share of the market for adding subtitles as well as other translation services for film and television. In Israel, since foreign language movies and TV programs are rarely dubbed, there is a constant need to provide these services.

See also
Israeli-occupied territories
Status of territories occupied by Israel in 1967

References

Israeli settlements in the Golan Heights
Kibbutzim
Kibbutz Movement
Populated places established in 1971
Golan Regional Council
Populated places in Northern District (Israel)
1971 establishments in the Israeli Military Governorate